Metachrostis velocior is a species of moth of the family Erebidae. It was described by Staudinger in 1892. It is found on Malta, Crete and Cyprus, as well as in southern Italy, Greece, Turkey and the Middle East.

References

 "Metachrostis velocior (Staudinger, 1892)". Insecta.pro. Retrieved November 18, 2019.

Moths described in 1892
Boletobiinae
Moths of Europe
Moths of Asia
Moths of the Middle East